Joseph A. Lashinger, Jr. (born August 7, 1953) is a former Republican member of the Pennsylvania House of Representatives.

References

Republican Party members of the Pennsylvania House of Representatives
Living people
People from Darby, Pennsylvania
1953 births